The 1946 Arkansas Intercollegiate Conference football season was the season of college football played by the eight member schools of the Arkansas Intercollegiate Conference (AIC) as part of the 1946 college football season. Led by head coach John Tucker, the Arkansas Tech Wonder Boys from Russellville, Arkansas, compiled a 9–1 record and won the AIC championship. None of the AIC teams was ranked in the Associated Press poll or played in a bowl game.

Conference overview

Teams

Arkansas Tech

The 1946 Arkansas Tech Wonder Boys football team represented Arkansas Tech University (sometimes referred to as "Arkansas Poly") as a member of the Arkansas Intercollegiate Conference (AIC) during the 1946 college football season. In their 14th year under head coach John Tucker, the Wonder Boys compiled a 9–1 record (6–0 against conference opponents), outcored all opponents by a total of 253 to 51, and won the AIC championship.

Ouachita Baptist

The 1946 Ouachita Baptist Tigers football team represented Ouachita Baptist College as a member of the Arkansas Intercollegiate Conference (AIC) during the 1946 college football season. Led by head coach Robert Smith, the Tigers compiled a 5–4 record (5–1 against conference opponents), outscored all opponents by a total of 163 to 121, and placed second in the AIC

Henderson State

The 1946 Henderson State Reddies football team represented Henderson State University as a member of the Arkansas Intercollegiate Conference (AIC) during the 1946 college football season. Led by head coach Duke Wells, the Reddies compiled a 6–3–1 record (4–2 against conference opponents), outscored opponents by a total of 142 to 131, and placed third in the AIC

Magnolia A&M

The 1946 Magnolia A&M Aggies football team represented Magnolia A&M College (later renamed Southern Arkansas University) as a member of the Arkansas Intercollegiate Conference (AIC) during the 1946 college football season. Led by first-year head coach Elmer Smith, the Aggies compiled a 4–5 record (3–2 against conference opponents), were outscored by their opponents by a total of 158 to 98, and placed fourth in the AIC.

Ozarks

The 1946 Ozarks Mountaineers football team represented the College of the Ozarks as a member of the Arkansas Intercollegiate Conference (AIC) during the 1946 college football season. Led by head coach Frank Koon, the Mountaineers compiled a 2–7 record (2–4 against conference opponents), were outscored by a total of 250 to 44, and placed fifth in the AIC.

Arkansas State Teachers

The 1946 Arkansas State Teachers Bears football team represented the Arkansas State Teachers College at Conway, Arkansas (now known as University of Central Arkansas) as a member of the Arkansas Intercollegiate Conference (AIC) during the 1946 college football season. Led by head coach Charles McGibbony, the Bears compiled a 2–6 record (1–3 against conference opponents), were outscored by a total of 139 to 57, and placed sixth in the AIC.

Hendrix

The 1946 Hendrix Warriors football team represented Hendrix College of Conway, Arkansas, as a member of the Arkansas Intercollegiate Conference (AIC) during the 1946 college football season. Led by head coach Ivan Grove, the Warriors compiled a 1–8 record (1–5 against conference opponents), were outscored by a total of 230 to 36, and placed seventh in the AIC.

Monticello A&M

The 1946 Monticello A&M Boll Weevils football team represented Arkansas A&M College at Monticello (now known as University of Arkansas at Monticello) as a member of the Arkansas Intercollegiate Conference (AIC) during the 1946 college football season. Led by head coach Doug Locke, the Boll Weevils compiled a 1–6–1 record (1–6 against conference opponents), were outscored by a total of 129 to 64, and placed last out of eight teams in the AIC.

References